Plymouth Place is a historic building located in Des Moines, Iowa, United States. Construction of the building was initiated by Plymouth Congregational Church, which faces Plymouth Place on the opposite side of Ingersoll Avenue. Ground-breaking occurred on June 12, 1966. This circular residential building was designed by local architect Raymond Hueholt. It has an unusual interior plan where a common central living room area is surrounded by peripheral living units. The building is also significant for providing quality affordable senior housing for low-income people regardless of religion or creed. At the time the Greenwood Park Plats Historic District was nominated for the National Register of Historic Places in 2013 it was considered a non-contributing property in the district, but it was considered significant on its own. The building was individually listed on the National Register of Historic Places in 2015.

References

Residential buildings completed in 1968
Apartment buildings in Des Moines, Iowa
National Register of Historic Places in Des Moines, Iowa
Apartment buildings on the National Register of Historic Places in Iowa
Modernist architecture in Iowa